The Nivelle offensive (16 April – 9 May 1917) was a Franco-British operation on the Western Front in the First World War which was named after General Robert Nivelle, the commander-in-chief of the French metropolitan armies, who led the offensive. The French part of the offensive was intended to be strategically decisive by breaking through the German defences on the Aisne front within  with casualties expected to be around  A preliminary attack was to be made by the French Third Army at St Quentin and the British First, Third and Fifth armies at Arras, to capture high ground and divert German reserves from the French fronts on the Aisne and in Champagne. The main offensive was to be delivered by the French on the Chemin des Dames ridge (the Second Battle of the Aisne). A subsidiary attack was to be made by the Fourth Army (the Third Battle of Champagne). The final stage of the offensive was to follow the meeting of the British and French armies, having broken through the German lines, to pursue the defeated German armies towards the German frontier.

The British Third and First armies achieved the deepest advance since trench warfare began, along the Scarpe river in the Battle of Arras, which inflicted many casualties on the Germans, attracted reserves and captured Vimy Ridge to the north. The main French offensive on the Aisne began on 16 April and also achieved considerable tactical success but the attempt to force a strategically decisive battle on the Germans was a costly failure and by 25 April the main offensive had been suspended.

The failure of the Nivelle strategy and the high number of French casualties led to mutinies, the dismissal of Nivelle, his replacement by Philippe Pétain and the adoption of a defensive strategy by the French, while their armies recuperated and rearmed. Fighting known as the Battle of the Observatories continued for local advantage all summer on the Chemin des Dames and along the Moronvilliers heights east of Reims. In late October, the French conducted the Battle of La Malmaison (23–27 October), a limited-objective attack on the west end of the Chemin-des-Dames, which forced the Germans to abandon their remaining positions on the ridge and retire across the Ailette valley. The British remained on the offensive for the rest of the year fighting the battles of Messines, 3rd Ypres and Cambrai.

Background

Strategic developments

After the costly fighting at the Verdun and on the Somme in 1916, General Robert Nivelle replaced Marshal Joseph Joffre as the commander of the French armies on the Western Front in December. Nivelle claimed that a massive barrage on German lines would bring France victory in 48 hours. The Russian Revolution, the German withdrawal to the Hindenburg Line and the likelihood of a declaration of war by the US, made some assumptions of the plan obsolete. At a meeting on 6 April, despite the doubts of other politicians, the army group commanders and the British, Alexandre Ribot, the new French Prime Minister supported the plan. Nivelle offered his resignation but it was refused, despite Nivelle's authority having been undermined. The principal effort was an attack on the German positions along the Chemin des Dames ridge, in the Second Battle of the Aisne and an eventual link with the British. The plan had been in development since December 1916 but the preparations were plagued by delays and information leaks. By April 1917, the plans were well known to the German army, which made extensive defensive preparations, by adding fortifications to the Aisne front and reinforcing the 7th Army ( Max von Boehn) with divisions released by the retreat to the Hindenburg Line in Operation Alberich.

Prelude

Franco-British offensive preparations
Forty-nine infantry and five cavalry divisions were massed on the Aisne front with  The ground at Brimont began to rise to the west towards Craonne and then reached a height of  along a plateau which continued westwards to Fort Malmaison.

German defensive preparations
German air reconnaissance was possible close to the front although longer-range sorties were impossible to protect because of the greater number of Allied aircraft. On 6 April a division was seen encamped near Arras, troop and transport columns crowded the streets, more narrow-gauge railways and artillery were seen to have moved closer to the front. British aerial activity opposite the 6th Army greatly increased and by 6 April Ludendorff was certain that an attack was imminent. By early April German air reinforcements had arrived the Arras front, telephone networks had been completed and a common communications system for the air and ground forces built.

The  arranged to meet the attack but it was cancelled. Dawn reconnaissance had been ordered, to scrutinise French preparations and they gave the first warning of attack on 16 April. German artillery-observation aircraft crews were able to range guns on terrain features, areas and targets before the offensive began so that the positions of the heaviest French guns, advanced batteries and areas not under French bombardment could be reported quickly along with the accuracy of German return-fire. Ground communication with the German artillery was made more reliable by running telephone lines along steep slopes and deep valleys which were relatively free of French artillery-fire; wireless control stations had been set up during the winter to link aircraft to the guns.

Battle

St. Quentin–Arras

The main attack on 13 April made very little progress, against a German defence relying mainly on machine-gun fire and local counter-attacks. On 9 April the British Third Army attacked to the east of Arras from Croisilles to Ecurie, against Observation Ridge, north of the Arras–Cambrai road and then towards Feuchy and the German second and third lines. The Third Army attack on the German defences either side of the Scarpe river penetrated , the furthest advance achieved since the beginning of trench warfare. Most of the objectives had been reached by the evening of 10 April, except for the line between Wancourt and Feuchy around Neuville-Vitasse. The village fell that day, although the German garrisons in some parts of  held out for several more days. The Third Army consolidated and then advanced on Monchy-le-Preux.

To the north the First Army attacked from Ecurie north of the Scarpe to Vimy Ridge. German reserves had been held too far back from the front and did not begin to reach the battlefield until the evening, when they were able only to reinforce the survivors of the front defences in improvised positions. The British engaged in several general attacks and limited attacks, which took more ground but became increasingly costly, against a German defence which recovered from the defeats of 9 April and organised reverse-slope defences, which were much easier to hold. By 16 May the British had made significant advances and captured  guns but had been unable to achieve a breakthrough. New tactics had been used, particularly in the first phase and had demonstrated that set-piece assaults against elaborately fortified positions could be successful.

Chemin des Dames

From the beginning German machine-gunners were able to engage the French infantry and inflict many casualties, although German artillery-fire was far less destructive. Courcy on the right flank was captured but the advance was stopped at the Aisne–Marne canal. The canal was crossed further north and Bermericourt was captured against a determined German defence. From Bermericourt to the Aisne the French attack was repulsed and south of the river French infantry were forced back to their start-line. On the north bank of the Aisne the French attack was more successful, the 42nd and 69th divisions reached the German second position between the Aisne and the Miette, the advance north of Berry penetrating .

The VI Corps advanced on its west of the Oise–Aisne Canal with its right wing but the left wing was held up. To the east of Vauxaillon at the north end of the Sixth Army, Mont des Singes was captured with the help of British heavy artillery but then lost to a German counter-attack. The Sixth Army operations took  but no break-through as achieved and at only one point had the German second position been reached.

On the second day Nivelle ordered the Fifth Army to attack north-eastwards to reinforce success, believing that the Germans intended to hold the ground in front of the Sixth Army. The German retirement was carried out urgently and many guns were left behind, along with "vast" stocks of munitions.

Nivelle ordered the Tenth Army forward between the Fifth and Sixth armies on 21 April and local operations were continued on the fronts of the Fourth and Fifth armies with little success. On  Brimont was to be captured, which would have been of great tactical value to the French; the attack was postponed on the orders of the French government and was then cancelled. By the end of 5 May the Sixth Army had reached the outskirts of Allemant and taken  by 10 May  and  had been taken by the French armies.

Champagne

The right flank guard to the east of Suippes was established by the 24th Division and Aubérive on the east bank of the river and the 34th Division took Mont Cornillet and Mont Blond. The  were held against a German counter-attack on 19 April by the 5th and 6th ( divisions,) the 23rd Division and one regiment between Nauroy and Moronvilliers. On the west bank, the Moroccan Division was repulsed on the right and captured Mont sans Nom on the left. The Fourth Army attacks took  and  German attacks on 27 May had temporary success before French counter-attacks recaptured the ground around Mont Haut; lack of troops had forced the Germans into piecemeal attacks instead of a simultaneous attack along all of the front.

Aftermath

Analysis

In 2015, Andrew Uffindell wrote that retrospective naming and dating of events can affect the way in which the past is understood. The Second Battle of the Aisne began on 16 April but the duration and extent of the battle have been interpreted differently. The ending of the battle is usually given as mid-May but Uffindell called this politically convenient, since it excluded the Battle of La Malmaison, in October, making it easier to blame Nivelle for a disaster. Uffindel wrote that the exclusion of La Malmaison was artificial, since the attack was begun from the ground taken from April to May. General Franchet d'Espèrey called La Malmaison "the decisive phase of the Battle...that began on 16 April and ended on 2 November....".

The operation had been planned as  a decisive blow to the Germans but by 20 April it was clear that the strategic intent of the offensive had not been achieved and by 25 April most of the fighting had ended. On 3 May the French 2nd Division refused to follow orders to attack and this mutiny soon spread throughout the army. Towards the end of the offensive, the 2nd Division arrived on the battlefield drunk and without weapons. From  there were disturbances in a Chasseur battalion of the 127th Division and a regiment of the 18th Division. Two days later a battalion of the 166th Division staged a demonstration and on 20 May, the 128th Regiment of the 3rd Division and the 66th Regiment of the 18th Division refused orders; individual incidents of insubordination occurred in the 17th Division. Over the next two days spokesmen were elected in two regiments of the 69th Division to petition for an end of the offensive. By 28 May, mutinies had occurred in the 9th Division, 158th Division, 5th Division and the 1st Cavalry Division. A record  soldiers deserted in 1917; the offensive was suspended on 9 May.

The army, politicians and public were stunned by the chain of events and on 16 May, Nivelle was sacked and moved to North Africa. He was replaced by the considerably more cautious Pétain, with Foch as chief of the General Staff; the new commanders abandoned the strategy of decisive battle for one of recuperation and defence, to avoid high casualties and to restore morale. Pétain had  shot as examples and introduced reforms to improve the welfare of French troops, which had a significant effect in restoring morale. The French tactic of assault  suited the German defensive dispositions, since much of the new construction had taken place on reverse slopes. The speed of attack and the depth of the French objectives meant that there was no time to establish artillery observation posts overlooking the Ailette valley, in the areas where French infantry had reached the ridge. Tunnels and caves under the ridge nullified much of the destructive effect of the French artillery, which was also hampered by poor visibility and by German air superiority, which made French artillery-observation aircraft even less effective. The rear edge of the German battle zone along the ridge had been reinforced with machine-gun posts; the German divisional commanders chose to fight in the front line and few of the  divisions were needed to intervene in the battle in the first few days.

Casualties

 (GQG), the French general headquarters had predicted  and French medical services were overwhelmed when the offensive began. In 1920, Hayes wrote that British casualties were  Russian casualties  In 1939, Wynne wrote that the French lost  including  in the first few days but that the effect on military and civilian morale was worse than the casualties.

In 1962, G. W. L. Nicholson the Canadian official historian, recorded German losses of  French casualties of  Most of the new French Schneider tanks were destroyed by artillery fire. From 16 April to 10 May the Fourth, Fifth, Sixth and Tenth armies took  and  The advance of the Sixth Army was one of the largest made by a French army since trench warfare began.

Subsequent French operations

Battle of the Observatories

An attack by the Tenth Army took Vauclair and the I Colonial Corps took the ruins of Laffaux Mill, before operations were suspended again on 8 May. The Germans began a counter-offensive from Vauxaillon at the west end of the Chemin des Dames, to the Californie plateau between Hurtebise and Craonne, beyond the east end of the Chemin des Dames and against the Moronvilliers Heights east of Reims, which lasted throughout June. German attacks on  prompted a French counter-attack on 18 June and another German attack on 21 June. The main German effort was made in the centre, with five attacks against the Californie plateau from  followed by another German attack on 17 June.

The capture of the Dragon's Cave marked the beginning of the Battle of the Observatories proper, which lasted all summer, as both sides fought for possession of the high ground on the Chemin des Dames.

Verdun

German attacks were conducted against  304 and Mort Homme on  beginning a period of attack and counter-attack which continued into July and August. On the right bank Bois Talou, Champneuville,  344, part of Bois Fosse, Bois Chaume and Mormont Farm were captured. Next day  304, Samogneux and Régnieville fell and on 26 August the French reached the southern outskirts of Beaumont. Ludendorff wrote that the French army had "quickly overcome its depression".

Battle of La Malmaison

The Battle of La Malmaison (  1917) led to the French capture of the village and fort of La Malmaison and control of the Chemin des Dames ridge. Gas bombardments on low-lying land near the canal dispersed very slowly and became so dense that the carriage of ammunition and supplies to the front was made impossible.  divisions were distributed in battalions along the front line and caught in the French bombardments, where the infantry shelters had been identified by French air reconnaissance and systematically destroyed.

The French infantry and  reached the German second position according to plan, the 38th Division captured  and XXI Corps took Allemant and Vaudesson. In four days the French advanced  and forced the Germans off the Chemin des Dames, back to the north bank of the Ailette valley, by the night of  The French took   and  mortars for losses of

Subsequent British operations

Messines

Since mid-1915, the British had been covertly digging mines under the German positions on the ridge.  the mines were fired on 7 June at  British Summer Time. When the infantry advanced over the far edge of the ridge, German artillery and machine-guns on the valley floor had direct observation over the British, whose artillery was less able to provide covering fire. Fighting continued on the lower slopes on the east side of the ridge until 14 June. The attack prepared the way for the main attack later in the summer, by removing the Germans from the dominating ground on the southern face of the Ypres salient, which they had held for two years.

Third Battle of Ypres

The British conducted a series of attacks in Flanders, beginning with the Battle of Pilckem Ridge (31 July – 2 August), followed by the Battle of Langemarck (16–18 August), The Battle of the Menin Road Ridge (20–25 September), The Battle of Polygon Wood (26 September – 3 October), The Battle of Broodseinde (4 October) The Battle of Poelcappelle (9 October) The First Battle of Passchendaele (12 October) and The Second Battle of Passchendaele (26 October – 10 November) for control of the ridges south and east of the Belgian city of Ypres (Ieper) in West Flanders. The next stage of the Allied strategy was an advance to Torhout–Couckelaere, to close the German-controlled railway running through Roulers and Thourout. Further operations and a British supporting attack along the Belgian coast from Nieuwpoort, combined with an Operation Hush an amphibious landing, were then to reach Bruges and then the Dutch frontier. The resistance of the German 4th Army, unusually wet weather, the onset of winter and the diversion of British and French resources to Italy, following the Austro-German victory at the Battle of Caporetto (24 October – 19 November) allowed the Germans to avoid a general withdrawal, which had seemed inevitable to them in October. The campaign ended in November when the Canadian Corps captured Passchendaele. The German submarine bases on the coast remained but the objective of diverting the Germans from the French further south, while they recovered from the failure of the Nivelle Offensive, succeeded.

See also

 1917 French Army mutinies
 Russian Expeditionary Force in France

Footnotes

Notes

References

Further reading

Books
 
 
 
 
 
 

Websites

External links

 Pétain: A Crisis of Morale in the French Nation at War, 16 April – 23 October 1917
 Pierrfeu Nivelle Offensive (in French)

Conflicts in 1917
Battles of the Western Front (World War I)
Battles of World War I involving France
Battles of World War I involving Germany
Battles of World War I involving the United Kingdom
Battles of World War I involving Canada
Battles of World War I involving Australia
World War I in the Pas-de-Calais
1917 in France
April 1917 events
May 1917 events